Adrien Eugène Joseph Max Orban (22 July 1881 – 23 May 1969) was a Belgian rower. He competed at the 1906 Intercalated Games in Athens with the men's coxed pair (1 mile) teamed up with his brother Rémy where they won silver.

References

1881 births
1969 deaths
Belgian male rowers
Olympic rowers of Belgium
Rowers at the 1906 Intercalated Games
People from Herve
Royal Club Nautique de Gand rowers
European Rowing Championships medalists
Sportspeople from Liège Province